Future City Competition is an international competition (formerly a national competition) in the United States that focuses on improving students' math, engineering, and science skills. The program is open to students in the 6th, 7th, and 8th grades who attend a public, private or home school.

The Future City Competition is an example of problem-based learning with computer simulation, in STEM (Science, Technology, Engineering, and Mathematics) education. The program asks 6th, 7th and 8th grade students from around the nation to team with engineer-volunteer mentors to create – first on computer and then in three-dimensional models – their visions of the city of tomorrow. A program of the DiscoverE organization, it has been operating since 1992 and currently serves over 40,000 students.

Aims
The aim of the Future City Competition is to provide an exciting educational engineering program for sixth, seventh and eighth grade students that combines a stimulating engineering challenge with an inquiry-based application to present their vision of a city of the future.

Benefits
The Future City Competition provides a platform for students to increase their:
 Ability to work in teams,
 Research and technical writing,
 Oral presentation skills,
 Application of coursework to practical problems,
 An awareness of community and business issues on the local and global levels.

National Academic Content Standards
The Future City Competition components are strongly aligned with many national educational standards relating to STEM fields.

State Academic Content Standards
State Academic Standards are based on the National Academic Standards. 
Two levels: regional competitions and the national finals for the winners of the previous contests. The goal is to design a futuristic city and discuss its important elements: urban planning, zoning, transportation, energy, economy, environment, and education.

Team members represent their ideas and proposals in several ways:
Essay about the yearly theme (for example, the theme of the 2016–17 competition is the "Power of Public Space" where students are challenged to design a Future City that includes a distributed network of innovative, multi-use public spaces that serves their city's diverse population).
A City Narrative discussing their city's attributes, features, and main concepts.
A Physical Model to show a physical representation of their city. The model is to consist of as many recycled materials as possible, and must cost less than 100 dollars.
Computer Design using Sim City software.
Presentation to describe their city to the judges on the day of the competition.

Awards and prizes 
Teams that win their Regional Competitions advance to the International Finals. Teams competing at the International Finals have the opportunity to win the following prizes:
1st Place: A trip to Space Camp and $7,500 from Bentley Systems
2nd Place: $5,000 from the National Society of Professional Engineers
3rd Place: $2,000 from IEEE-USA
4th Place: $750 from Ohio University
5th Place: $750 from the National Council of Examiners for Engineering and Surveying

2006–2007 National Competition 
Theme: Fuel Cells

1st Place: St. Thomas More School – Louisiana
2nd Place: Nevada Christian Home School – Nevada (Northern)
3rd Place: Helen Keller Middle School – Michigan

2007–2008 National Competition 
Theme: Urban Disasters

1st Place: Heritage Middle School – Westerville, Ohio
2nd Place: Farnsworth Middle School – New York Albany
3rd Place: Our Lady Help of Christians School – Philadelphia

2008–2009 National Competition 
Theme: Water

1st Place:  Bexley Middle School – Ohio
2nd Place:  St. Thomas More – Louisiana
3rd Place:  St. Thomas the Apostle – Florida (South)

2009–2010 National Competition 
1st Place:  Davidson IB Middle School – North Carolina
2nd Place:  Valley Middle School – New Jersey
3rd Place:  Northern Nevada Home School – Nevada (Northern)

2013–2014 National Competition 
Theme: Tomorrow's Transit

1st Place: St. John Lutheran School – Michigan
2nd Place: Valley Middle School – New Jersey
3rd Place: HEAR Rockwall Homeschool – Texas (North)

2014–2015 National Competition 
Theme: Feeding Future Cities

1st Place: St. John Lutheran School – Michigan
2nd Place: West Ridge Middle School – Austin, Texas
3rd Place: Academy for Science and Foreign Language – Huntsville, Alabama

2015–2016 National Competition 
Theme: Waste Not, Want Not

1st Place: Academy for Science and Foreign Language – Huntsville, Alabama
2nd Place: Harbor View Academy – Texas (North)
3rd Place: St. John Lutheran School – Michigan

2016-2017 National Competition 
This year was the 25th anniversary of the Future City competition with the year's theme being "The Power of Public Space"

 1st Place: West Ridge Middle School - Austin, Texas

2017-2018 National Competition 
Theme: Age Friendly Cities

 1st Place: Edlin School - Reston, VA
2nd Place: Keyport Public Schools - Monmouth County, NJ
3rd Place: Miftaahul Uloom Academy - Union City, NJ

2018-2019 
Theme: Powering our Future

 1st Place: Warwick Middle School - Lititz, PA
 2nd Place: Academy for Science and Foreign Language - Huntsville, Alabama
 3rd Place: JerseySTEM - New Jersey Region
 4th Place: Sacred Heart Catholic School - Idaho Region
 5th Place: Edlin School - Mid-Atlantic Region

References

External links
Future City Competition website
Future City Competition winners

Science competitions
Youth science